Cloxestradiol, also known as 17-(2,2,2-trichloroethoxy)estradiol, is a synthetic, steroidal estrogen which was never marketed. It is an analogue of estradiol with a 2,2,2-trichloroethoxy substitution. The O,O-diacetate derivative, cloxestradiol acetate (brand name Genovul), has been marketed as an estrogen.

See also
 List of estrogens
 List of estrogen esters

References

Abandoned drugs
Sterols
Phenols
Estranes
Estrogen ethers
Synthetic estrogens
Trichloromethyl compounds